Joseph William Gilgun (born 9 March 1984) is an English actor known for several roles, including that of Vinnie O'Neill in the Sky One series Brassic, Marcus in Hollyoaks, Eli Dingle in the ITV soap opera Emmerdale, Jamie Armstrong in the long-running ITV soap  opera Coronation Street , Woody in the film This Is England (2006) and its subsequent spin-off series, and Rudy Wade in E4's Misfits. From 2016 to 2019, he starred in the AMC television adaptation of the Vertigo comic Preacher as the Irish vampire Cassidy.

Early life
Gilgun was born in Chorley, Lancashire, to Judith and Andrew Gilgun. He grew up in Rivington, Lancashire, as part of a working-class family with his two younger sisters, Jennie Seddon and Rosie Thomson. Gilgun attended Rivington VA Primary School and Southlands High School. He has dyslexia and ADHD, which he describes as the "biggest pain of [his] life" and in interviews has openly discussed depression and anxiety. He started drama workshops at the age of eight, following advice from an educational psychologist, and was described as having "exceptional talent". He also trained at the Laine Johnson Theatre School and the Oldham Theatre Workshop. When he was 10, he got his first TV acting role in Coronation Street. He stayed with the show until he was thirteen years old.

Gilgun studied A Levels at Runshaw College. Outside of odd jobs and a few roles in small theatre productions, Gilgun worked as a plasterer until returning to acting full-time with Emmerdale in 2006.

Career

1994–2006: Early career 
As a child actor, Gilgun played little tearaway Jamie Armstrong in Coronation Street between 1994 and 1997. He left the soap when the actress playing his on-screen mother left the show. Gilgun revisited the set in an ITV special The Kids from Coronation Street in 2004. In 1998, when he was 14 years old, he presented a feature on Wish You Were Here...? where he visited Phantasialand, one of Germany's largest theme parks.

Gilgun took a break in his teens, acting part-time in local and national stage productions including the Salford-based Hanky Park the Musical at The Lowry. He played Charlie Millwall in a critically acclaimed tour of the stage play Borstal Boy, which ended at the Edinburgh Fringe Festival.

Gilgun found the break from acting difficult, telling The Guardian in December 2011 that "[I] went off the fucking rails" and became confused about what to do with his life. He ended up working as a plasterer.

2006–2015: This is England franchise and Misfits 
He returned to acting full-time in 2006, when he won the roles of both trouble-prone Eli Dingle in long-running soap opera Emmerdale and kind-hearted skinhead Woody in This Is England, his debut as a film actor. This Is England was released in the UK on 27 April 2007 and subsequently won several awards including a BAFTA for Best British Film in 2008.

In 2007, Gilgun starred alongside welterweight boxing champion Michael Jennings in a locally produced feature-length documentary entitled Chorley: Where People Go to Fight. All proceeds went to Derian House Children's Hospice, with Gilgun helping to present the cheque. Additionally, he appeared in a Dingle-centred episode of Ghosthunting with... hosted by Yvette Fielding.

Gilgun was granted time off from Emmerdale to shoot the 2009 British crime thriller Harry Brown, where he played drug dealer Kenny Soames. Gilgun announced he would leave Emmerdale on 10 November 2009, feeling the time was right to move on. His last appearance was on 30 April 2010. An Emmerdale representative said the programme had not ruled out a future return for the character. Gilgun later indicated he currently had no such plans.

Gilgun reprised the character of Woody for three Channel 4 TV spin-off series of This Is England, called This Is England '86. and This is England '88 and This Is England '90, which aired in September 2010, December 2011 and 2015 respectively. In 2010, This is England writer-director Shane Meadows referred Gilgun to star in longtime collaborator Paul Fraser's music video for the song "Dead American Writers" by Tired Pony.

On 9 May 2011, it was announced that Gilgun had been cast as newcomer Rudy Wade in the third series of Misfits. The character Rudy can manifest a clone of himself that roughly represents his conscience. He appeared in the first episode of the third series in late October 2011. He replaced as lead the character of Nathan following the departure of Robert Sheehan. An online short called Vegas Baby covered Nathan Young's exit and Rudy's arrival. Gilgun said that replacing Sheehan had "been frightening... You'd think that it'd be a total ballache, what with being new and stuff and Rob doing such a good job".

In the following years, Gilgun appeared in the 2012 American science fiction film Lockout, co-written and produced by Luc Besson and starring Guy Pearce, the 2013 BBC series Ripper Street as a Fagin-type character, Carmichael, as well as starring in the final two series of Misfits. He appears in the music video for "Tiny Legs" by Then Thickens, released in 2014. Having been friends with a few members of the band from growing up around Chorley, Joe agreed to star in the video. It involved him having makeup, flour and eggs applied to his face amongst other things and took several, messy takes to get right.

In 2015, Gilgun played Ellic in Breck Eisner's The Last Witch Hunter alongside Michael Caine, Vin Diesel, and Elijah Wood.

2015–Present: Continuing work with television 
In March 2015 Gilgun earned the role of drug-addicted, Irish vampire Cassidy, one of the main characters in the AMC series Preacher. Speaking of the casting of Gilgun, Preacher executive producer Seth Rogen said: "It's one of those things that happens only a few times throughout your career, where you just go 'Oh, it's you. You're the character that is written on the page'... You could tell Joe's lived like 100 lifetimes, and he's probably done some shit you do not want to hear about, but at the same time, he's one of the most fun, loving people you'll ever be around. And it was exactly what the character needed to be."

In Spring 2015, Gilgun both filmed the pilot episode of Preacher, as well as The Infiltrator, a 2016 crime thriller film starring Bryan Cranston.

Gilgun was part of the main cast of all four series of Preacher which premiered on 22 May 2016 and concluded on 29 September 2019. Additionally, Gilgun was also an executive producer of the show, producing half of its third series and all of its fourth.

In 2019, Gilgun created, executive produced, and starred in the Sky One comedy series Brassic. Gilgun stars as Vinnie, a working-class petty criminal living in Northern England. The six-episode series premiere on 22 August 2019. The series was well-reviewed and received a second series renewal before the first series had aired. The show's third series was broadcast in October 2021. Filming for Brassic's 4th series started in August 2021. In August 2021, prior to the airing of the third series, a fourth began filming and premiered on 7 September 2022. In August 2022, the series was renewed for a fifth series, and started filming that month to premiere in 2023.

Personal life 

Gilgun has developed a close relationship with his co-stars from the This Is England stories, referring to them in interviews as "the gang".

He has opened up in podcasts and various media sources about his bipolar disorder and the effects that has had on his life. He has stated that many of the stories within the show Brassic are based upon his life.

Filmography

Film

Television

Awards and nominations

References

External links

 
 Eli Dingle at ITV/Emmerdale

1984 births
Living people
People from Chorley
Male actors from Lancashire
English male child actors
English male film actors
English male soap opera actors
English male television actors
People with bipolar disorder
Actors with dyslexia
20th-century English male actors
21st-century English male actors